Pablo Cuevas was the defending champion but lost in the quarterfinals to Daniel Altmaier.

Oscar Otte won the title after defeating Thiago Seyboth Wild 6–2, 6–7(4–7), 6–4 in the final.

Seeds

Draw

Finals

Top half

Bottom half

References

External links
Main draw
Qualifying draw

Open du Pays d'Aix - Singles
2020 Singles